The Gambell Sites are five archeological sites which established a chronology of over 2000 years of human habitation on St. Lawrence Island near Gambell, Alaska.

The sites (named Hillside, Mayughaaq, Ayveghyaget, Old Gambell, and Seklowaghyag) have provided evidence of four cultural phases of the Thule tradition. Digging first began in 1927 and the sites were labelled a National Historic Landmark in 1962.  As with all previously existing National Historic Landmark sites, the sites were listed on the National Register of Historic Places when the registry opened in 1966.

Over the 20th century, the archeological value of the sites was largely destroyed due to locals digging up the buried ivory and the landmark designation was withdrawn in 1989.  The sites remain listed on the National Register.

See also
National Register of Historic Places listings in Nome Census Area, Alaska

References

Archaeological sites on the National Register of Historic Places in Alaska
Buildings and structures in Nome Census Area, Alaska
Former National Historic Landmarks of the United States
National Register of Historic Places in Nome Census Area, Alaska
Native American history of Alaska